Ooh La La is the fourth and final studio album by the English rock band Faces, released in March 1973. It reached number one in the UK Albums Chart in the week of 28 April 1973. On 28 August 2015, the album was reissued in  remastered form on vinyl, and remastered and expanded on CD as part of the box set (along with the rest of the Faces catalogue of studio recordings) 1970–1975: You Can Make Me Dance, Sing Or Anything....

Background
By the end of 1972, following the critical and commercial successes of Rod Stewart's solo albums, the singer had become increasingly distanced from some of his Faces bandmates, who were frustrated by the fact that by this point they had come to be perceived by the public (and even by some concert promoters) as little more than Stewart's backing band for live work. Stewart himself was reportedly distracted enough by his newfound stardom that he missed the first two weeks of recording sessions for the latest Faces album entirely. The production of the album would continue to be hampered by the singer's apparent lack of commitment to the project, with Stewart not appearing in any capacity on three of the LP's ten released tracks. As a result of this situation, Ooh La La was, according to Ian McLagan, "Ronnie [Lane]'s album", with founder member Lane's contributions setting the tone of the LP's quieter, more reflective second side.

Despite the difficult circumstances of the recording sessions, producer Glyn Johns held the group together, helping to placate internal tensions (as he had with the Beatles during their Get Back sessions); his efforts enabled the Faces to record a focused, concise album in the manner of its predecessor, A Nod Is As Good As a Wink... to a Blind Horse (the band's first two albums were, in contrast, lengthier self-produced affairs). Once the recording of Ooh La La was completed, the album's credits optimistically suggested an intention to work with Johns again in the future, with the comment: "Produced by Glyn Johns (see you in a year)".

Subsequent events
Shortly after Ooh La Las March 1973 release, Stewart reported to the New Musical Express that he felt that the LP was a "stinking rotten album". He expounded further in the pages of Melody Maker, stating that the album was "A bloody mess. But I shouldn't say that, should I? Well, I should say it in a few weeks' time. Not now. I mean, the public ain't gonna like me saying it's a bloody mess. It was a disgrace. Maybe I'm too critical. But look, I don't like it ... All that fucking about taking nine months [sic] to do an album like 'Ooh La La' doesn't prove anything. But I'm not going to say anything more about it." A subsequent attempt to qualify these statements only served to highlight his earlier lack of tact, when he told Rolling Stone magazine that what he had actually meant to say was that the group was "capable of doing a better album than we've done. I just don't think we've found the right studios, or the right formula".

Despite Stewart's misgivings the LP reached number one in the UK Albums Chart during April, being the only collection of original Faces material to achieve that distinction. Rather than celebrate their success, however, the rest of the group were understandably dismayed by the harshness of Stewart's comments, especially considering his perceived lack of commitment to fully participate in the album's recording. In his 2000 autobiography All The Rage, Ian McLagan wrote: "The week the album came out he did all he could to scuttle it and told anyone who would listen how useless it was". Ronnie Lane, having assumed the creative workload due to Stewart's apparent disinterest, was especially stung by the vocalist's criticism. No longer content with the prospect of being increasingly sidelined in the band that he had co-founded with Kenney Jones back in 1965, Lane left the Faces early in June, a decision that he would reportedly later regret (if not creatively, then at least financially). His role as bassist (but, tellingly, not as songwriter or secondary vocalist) was filled shortly thereafter by former Free bassist Tetsu Yamauchi.

Faces went on to record two further singles, but while they toured extensively over the next two-and-a-half years, with Lane gone they never again recorded a full album of original studio material (aside from a brief, abortive attempt early in 1975). The group eventually ground to a halt in November 1975 as Stewart seemed to lose interest in them entirely, while guitarist Ronnie Wood moonlighted in the Rolling Stones prior to his official enlistment as Mick Taylor's replacement. For the remainder of the 1970s Lane went on to a more creatively fulfilling but financially unrewarding solo career, while Jones and McLagan briefly reunited with Steve Marriott in a reformation of the Small Faces.

Album cover
The cover of the album was designed by Jim Ladwig, around a stylised photograph of "Gastone", a stage character of 1920s Italian comedian Ettore Petrolini. The original LP's art deco-inspired cover was constructed in such a way that when the top edge of the sleeve was pressed down, a concealed die-cut design element would descend that made Gastone's eyes appear to discolour and move to the side, and his jaw would appear to drop into a leering smile. The back cover also featured art deco-inspired design elements, and detailed song information and album credits alongside tinted individual photographic portraits of the band members. The original gatefold sleeve's inner design depicted a large stylised photomontage of the band in typical 'laddish' pose, admiring the charms of a Can-can dancer (referencing the lyric of the title track).

The album was reissued in a remastered and expanded form on 28 August 2015, including early rehearsal takes of three of its tracks. The vinyl reissue did not contain any bonus tracks, but did replicate the original LP cover with the animated picture of Gastone.

The tracks
The LP included one composition by the whole band (excepting Stewart), the instrumental "Fly in the Ointment". This was the only joint composition by the four instrumentalists to make it onto any of their original albums; usually their efforts were relegated to the B-sides of singles - such as "Ointment"s contemporary, "Skewiff (mend the fuse)" (which served as B-side to the "Cindy Incidentally" single, a UK No. 2). Stewart's compositions for the album were written mostly in tandem with Wood and McLagan, although in a departure from the norm two more songs were written by Stewart in sole partnership with Lane. One of these, "Flags And Banners", featured (again unusually) Stewart accompanying Wood on either banjo or a secondary guitar part, while Lane handled vocal duties. The title track, by Wood and Lane, featured the only solo lead vocal performed in the studio by Wood during the band's existence, recorded at Glyn Johns' suggestion after neither Lane nor Stewart were said to be satisfied with their own attempts at it. Stewart apparently claimed at the time that the song was in the wrong key for him, but he later covered the song on his 1998 album When We Were the New Boys, in tribute to the recently deceased Lane. Lane himself performed the song he co-wrote on many occasions during his own post-Faces solo career.

Two other tracks from the sessions were released at the time; "Skewiff (mend the fuse)" as a B-side, and "Dishevelment Blues" (a throwaway blues parody in which the band - including Stewart - played and sang deliberately badly for comic effect) which was released as part of an album sampler flexidisc given away with copies of the New Musical Express to promote the LP. These two tracks (the latter long-prized by fans as a collector's item) were eventually compiled on the Five Guys Walk into a Bar... box set in 2004. Five outtakes from the sessions were also released as part of Five Guys..., while a number of other outtakes, mostly instrumentals, have also circulated unofficially among collectors over the years.

The album's title track "Ooh La La" is featured at the end of Wes Anderson's film Rushmore (1998), in the comedy film Without a Paddle (2004), and in numerous commercial and television soundtracks released since the year 2000. The song "Glad and Sorry" is featured in the films Blow (2001) and I'm Your Woman (2020).

The Golden Smog album, Down By The Old Mainstream, (1995) features a cover of "Glad and Sorry".

Track listing
Lead vocals by Rod Stewart except where noted.

Side one
"Silicone Grown" (Rod Stewart, Ronnie Wood) – 3:05
"Cindy Incidentally" (Ian McLagan, Stewart, Wood) – 2:37
"Flags and Banners" (Ronnie Lane, Stewart) – 2:00 (lead singer: Ronnie Lane)
"My Fault" (McLagan, Stewart, Wood) – 3:05 (lead singers: Rod Stewart, Ronnie Wood)
"Borstal Boys" (McLagan, Stewart, Wood) – 2:52

Side two
"Fly in the Ointment" (instrumental) (Kenney Jones, Lane, McLagan, Wood) – 3:49
"If I'm on the Late Side" (Lane, Stewart) – 2:36
"Glad and Sorry" (Lane) – 3:04 (lead singers: Ronnie Lane, Ronnie Wood, Ian McLagan)
"Just Another Honky" (Lane) – 3:32
"Ooh La La" (Lane, Wood) – 3:30 (lead singer: Ronnie Wood)

2015 reissue bonus tracks
 "Cindy Incidentally" [BBC Session] (McLagan, Stewart, Wood)
 "Borstal Boys" [rehearsal] (McLagan, Stewart, Wood)
 "Silicone Grown" [rehearsal] (Stewart, Wood)
 "Glad and Sorry" [rehearsal] (Lane)
 "Jealous Guy" [live at Reading Festival, Reading, UK, 25 August 1973, with Tetsu Yamauchi on bass] (John Lennon)

Charts

Personnel
Track numbering refers to CD and digital releases of the album.
Ronnie Lane – bass, rhythm and acoustic guitars, percussion, tambourine & lead vocal (tracks 3 & 8)
Ronnie Wood – lead electric, slide, acoustic and rhythm guitars, electric bouzouki, co-lead vocal (track 4 & 8) & lead vocal (track 10)
Ian McLagan – piano, organ, harmonium, backing vocals & co-lead vocal (track 8)
Kenney Jones – drums & percussion
Rod Stewart – lead vocal (tracks 1, 2, 4, 5, 7 & 9), banjo & secondary electric guitar (track 3) - not present on tracks 6, 8 & 10
Note: Stewart is only credited with playing electric guitar on track 3 in the Five Guys... booklet, so this credit may be in error (or may be the correction of an earlier omission).
Neemoi "Speedy" Aquaye – congas, shakers & percussion (track 6)
Glyn Johns – producer, engineer

Ron Nevison - engineer

References

1973 albums
Faces (band) albums
Warner Records albums
Albums produced by Glyn Johns
Albums recorded at Olympic Sound Studios